The 2010–11 Hawaii Rainbow Warriors basketball team represented the University of Hawaiʻi at Mānoa in the 2010–11 NCAA Division I men's basketball season. The Rainbow Warriors, led by head coach Gib Arnold, played their home games at the Stan Sheriff Center in Honolulu, Hawaii, as members of the Western Athletic Conference. The Rainbow Warriors finished 5th in the WAC during the regular season, and lost in the first round of the WAC tournament to San Jose State.

Hawaii failed to qualify for the NCAA tournament, but were invited to the 2011 CIT. The Rainbow Warriors won their first game, but were then eliminated in the second round of the tournament, losing to San Francisco, 77–74.

Roster 

Source

Schedule and results

|-
!colspan=9 style=|Exhibition

|-
!colspan=9 style=|Regular season

|-
!colspan=9 style=| WAC tournament

|-
!colspan=9 style=| CollegeInsider.com tournament

Source

References

Hawaii Rainbow Warriors basketball seasons
Hawaii
Hawaii
Hawaii men's basketball
Hawaii men's basketball